Amusement rides and stunt shows themed to the Batman franchise its derivative elements are commonly found at Warner Bros. and Six Flags amusement parks across the world.

Batman attractions at Six Flags parks

Batman: The Ride (B&M)

Batman: The Ride (not to be confused with the S&S version) is a steel inverted roller coaster manufactured by Bolliger & Mabillard. It is located at seven Six Flags theme parks including Six Flags Great America, Six Flags Great Adventure, Six Flags Magic Mountain, Six Flags St. Louis, Six Flags Over Georgia and Six Flags Over Texas. It was formerly located at Six Flags New Orleans before it was relocated to Six Flags Fiesta Texas and rethemed to Goliath.

Batman The Escape

Batman The Escape was a steel stand-up roller coaster at Six Flags AstroWorld. Originally, the queue was located inside the Batcave, but the entrance was moved in 1998. Formerly, the coaster operated as "Shockwave" at Six Flags Magic Mountain from 1986 to 1988 and Six Flags Great Adventure from 1990 to 1992.

Batman & Robin: The Chiller

Batman & Robin: The Chiller was a dual-tracked launched roller coaster based on the 1997 film Batman & Robin. It opened at Six Flags Great Adventure in 1997. After closing in 2007, the ride was demolished and sold to the Brazilian theme park Beto Carrero World, but was never re-assembled.

Batman: Knight Flight

Batman: Knight Flight was a floorless roller coaster at Six Flags Ohio that opened in the park's Gotham City area in 2000. After the park was sold to Cedar Fair in March 2004 for $145 million, the park became Geauga Lake and the ride's name was changed to "Dominator". Later, on September 16, 2007, the ride was closed after Cedar Fair's announcement that Geauga Lake would be closed permanently. Dominator was relocated to Kings Dominion in 2008, where it continues to operate today.

Batwing

Batwing is a steel flying roller coaster at Six Flags America. It opened in 2001, and is based on the Batwing, Batman's plane from the comics.

Batman: The Dark Knight

Batman: The Dark Knight is a steel floorless roller coaster at Six Flags New England. It opened in 2002, and was the first DC Comics themed attraction at the park after it was acquired by Six Flags in 1998. After The Dark Knight Coaster was announced for the 2009 season, its name was temporarily changed to "Batman: The Ride" but was then reverted to its former name after being cancelled due to building restrictions.

The Dark Knight Coaster

The Dark Knight Coaster is an enclosed Wild mouse roller coaster based on the film The Dark Knight. In the ride, guests board a Gotham City Rail subway car and are chased by The Joker before being saved by Batman. It opened at Six Flags Great Adventure and Six Flags Great America in 2008, and at Six Flags Mexico in 2009. Six Flags New England was also scheduled to open the ride in 2009, but it was cancelled due to building restrictions and placed in storage. In 2011, the ride was finally built as Gotham City Gauntlet: Escape from Arkham Asylum.

Batman: The Ride (S&S Free Spin)

Batman: The Ride (not to be confused with the B&M version) is a 4D Free Spin roller coaster at Six Flags Fiesta Texas. A clone of the ride will open at Six Flags Discovery Kingdom in 2019.

Justice League: Battle for Metropolis

Justice League: Battle for Metropolis is an interactive dark ride at seven Six Flags parks: Six Flags Over Texas, Six Flags St. Louis, Six Flags Mexico, Six Flags Great America, Six Flags Over Georgia, Six Flags Great Adventure, and Six Flags Magic Mountain. In the ride, Batman helps brief guests on their mission to save the captured members of the Justice League from Lex Luthor, breaks into LexCorp with Cyborg, and has a fist fight with Luthor himself. He also joins the League as they chased the two villains (and Harley Quinn in the Six Flags Magic Mountain version) into the Metropolis subway.

Batman shows at Six Flags parks

The Batman Stunt Show

The Batman Stunt Show was a stunt show that ran from 1992 to 1994 in the Batman Stunt Arena at Six Flags Great Adventure. The show was loosely based on the 1989 film Batman, featuring various elements from the film such as Michael Keaton's batsuit, the Batmobile, and Vicki Vale.

Batman Water Stunt Spectacular
The Batman Water Stunt Spectacular was a stunt show at Six Flags Astroworld. It operated from 1996 to 1998.  It was created and operated by Renaissance Entertainment.

Batman Forever

Batman Forever was a stunt show in the Batman Stunt Arena at Six Flags Great Adventure. It opened in the summer of 1995 to coincide with the film of the same name, featuring many elements from it.

Gotham City: Carnival of Chaos

Gotham City: Carnival of Chaos was a stunt show in the Batman Stunt Arena in 1999. It was the first Batman stunt show at the park not being based on a film, instead drawing inspiration from the comics.

Batman vs. Catwoman: Catfight

Batman vs. Catwoman: Catfight was a stunt show in the Batman Stunt Arena in 2004. In the show, Batman fights Catwoman in Gotham City.

Batman attractions at Warner Bros. Movie World parks

Batman Adventure – The Ride
Batman Adventure – The Ride was a motion simulator ride based on Tim Burton's Batman series. The ride was located at Warner Bros. Movie World from 1992-2001, Warner Bros. Movie World Germany from 1996 to 2004, and Parque Warner Madrid from 2002 to 2014. The Warner Bros. Movie World and Warner Bros. Movie World Germany versions were replaced with a sequel titled Batman Adventure - The Ride 2, while the Parque Warner Madrid version stayed in its original form from opening until closure.

Batman: Arkham Asylum

Batman: Arkham Asylum is an inverted steel roller coaster at Parque Warner Madrid. It is a clone of Batman: The Ride at Six Flags parks, and was previous known as Batman: La Fuga (Batman: The Escape) prior to the ride's addition of VR.

Batwing Spaceshot
Batwing Spaceshot is a Space Shot attraction at Warner Bros. Movie World. The ride opened the same year as the 2005 film Batman Begins, however there's no references to the film besides the ride's logo.

Justice League: Alien Invasion 3D

Justice League: Alien Invasion is an interactive dark ride at Warner Bros. Movie World. The ride opened in 2011, replacing Batman Adventure – The Ride. In the ride, Batman and the Justice League fight to save the people of Earth from the control of Starro.

Arkham Asylum – Shock Therapy

Arkham Asylum - Shock Therapy is a Vekoma SLC roller coaster at Warner Bros. Movie World, loosely based on the video game series Batman: Arkham.  It was previously known as Lethal Weapon – The Ride when it opened in 1995, but was re-themed to Arkham Asylum in 2012 after Warner Bros. feared that the Lethal Weapon theming was beginning to show its age.

DC Rivals HyperCoaster

DC Rivals HyperCoaster is a steel roller coaster at Warner Bros. Movie World. The theme of the ride is DC super heroes and their villains, including Batman and The Joker.

Batman: Knight Flight
Batman: Knight Flight (not to be confused with the dark ride of the same name) is a dark ride at Warner Bros. World Abu Dhabi. It opened with the rest of the park in summer 2018.

Justice League: Warworld Attacks

Justice League: Warworld Attacks is a dark ride at Warner Bros. World Abu Dhabi. It opened with the rest of the park on July 25, 2018.

Batman shows at Warner Bros. Movie World parks

The Total Batman Experience

The Total Batman Experience was a stunt show at Warner Bros. Movie World. It featured elements from the 1995 film Batman Forever.

Batman: Shadows of Gotham

Batman: Shadows of Gotham was a stunt show at Warner Bros. Movie World. It was based on the 2005 film Batman Begins, featuring Scarecrow, Ra's al Ghul, and the League of Shadows.

Batman attractions at Studio City Macau

 Batman Dark Flight
 Warner Brothers Fun Zone

List of rides

References

External links
Batman: Yesterday, Today, and Beyond - Rides
Batman: Yesterday, Today, and Beyond - Stunt Shows

 
Amusement rides
DC Comics in amusement parks